Direen Mahmood Mulla Bakr (born 13 January 2000) is an Iraqi football and futsal player who plays as a midfielder for Iraqi club Naft Al-Shamal.

International career
Mulla Bakr has been capped for Iraq at senior level in both football and futsal.

In football, she represented Iraq in the 2018 AFC Women's Asian Cup qualification in 2017, where she played five games.

In futsal, Mulla Bakr played for Iraq at the WAFF Women's Futsal Championship in 2022 and scored four goals including a goal in the final against Saudi Arabia which helped Iraq win the title for the first time in its history.

Honours
Iraq (futsal)
 WAFF Women's Futsal Championship: 2022

Naft Al-Shamal
 WAFF Women's Clubs Championship third place: 2022

See also
 Women's football in Iraq

References

2000 births
Living people
Iraqi women's footballers
Iraqi women's futsal players
Women's association football midfielders
Iraq women's international footballers
Saudi Women's Premier League players